The 2001–02 Eliteserien season was the 63rd season of ice hockey in Norway. Ten teams participated in the league, and Frisk Asker won the championship.

Regular season

Playoffs

Relegation

External links
Season on hockeyarchives.info

GET-ligaen seasons
Norway
GET